Rabie is a surname. Notable with the surname people include:

Anton Rabie, Canadian billionaire businessman
Ashraf Rabie (born 1983), Egyptian basketball player
Gurshwin Rabie (born 1983), South African cricketer
Mari Rabie (born 1986), South African triathlete
Mohammad Rabie (born 1978), Egyptian writer
Pieter Jacobus Rabie (1917–1997), South African judge
Ramy Rabie (born 1982), Egyptian footballer